Neoptychodes hondurae is a species of beetle in the family Cerambycidae. It was described by White in 1858.

Subspecies
 Neoptychodes hondurae hondurae (White, 1858)
 Neoptychodes hondurae trivittatus (Taschenberg, 1870)

References

Lamiini
Beetles described in 1858